Matt Marshall may refer to:

 Matt Marshall (writer), writer on The Simpsons
 Matt Marshall (golfer) (born 1985), American golfer